La Revue Du Monde Noir was a periodical created and edited by Paulette and Jane Nardal in 1931, France.  The publication ran for a course of six months and contained a wide variety of content including essays, short stories, and poems.  A great deal of the articles were situated in the anti-imperialist, negritude, and Harlem Renaissance movements.  As such, some of the primary focuses included anti-colonial politics and promoting black consciousness.  This ultimately was a source of controversy which led to a loss of funding and the end of the periodical.  Including a wide variety of prominent thinkers from around the world La Revue Du Monde Noir concerns itself with a wide range of issues such as economics and farming (Senateur Price-Mars), art (Louis Th. Achille), eugenics (Georges Gregory) and more.

Motto 
The inaugural volume began by detailing the goals of the periodical.  The three aims included: creating a space for black voices and publications, popularizing interests and concerns of the black race, and, finally, creating bonds of solidarity and fidelity.

"Our motto is and will continue to be:

For PEACE, WORK, and JUSTICE

By LIBERTY, EQUALITY, and FRATERNITY.

Thus, the two hundred million individuals which constitue one Negro race, even though scattered among the various nations, will form over and above the latter a great Brotherhood, the forerunner of universal Democracy."

Historical context 
Throughout 1919–1935 significant shifts were beginning to happen around ideas about race and cultural difference.  It was in this climate of change and renewal that "La Revue Du Monde Noir" was in publication.  Sometimes termed as a "diasporic" journal, the publication was intended to draw together the voices of black people around the globe.  In the first journal, Louis-Jean Finot wrote an article titled "Race Equality."  After some consideration of the problems facing different countries across the world, he called for a "solidarity between nations" and wrote "at the present time, selfishness is not only stupid, it is criminal."  This focus is in fitting with the periodical's aims which explicitly situated creating a sense of community as one of their primary goals.

"La Revue Du Monde Noir"  also took place as the Negritude movement began to take root.  The Negritude movement occurred throughout the 1930s among communities of displaced black and African people primarily throughout Europe.  Combining artistic and political approaches, the Negritude movement responded to the realities of what life under colonialism looked like.  Where black voices were historically devalued and silence, the Negritude movement did exactly the opposite.  Exalting the numerous political, cultural, artistic, and philosophic perspectives of black people was one of key focuses of the movement at large.  Notably, some of the founders of the movement (Léon Damas, Léopold Senghor and Aimé Césaire) would go on to mention the journal as an influential piece of how they developed their thinking.

At the same time, the Harlem Renaissance was occurring in the United States, primarily in the city of Harlem.  As slavery came to an end, many black people migrated to cities further North seeking greater rights and freedoms than those which were possible in the South.  This movement is often known as the "Great Migration."  Much like the Negritude movement in Europe, the Harlem Renaissance gave voice to a group of people which had historically been silenced and ignored.  Several of the key people in this movement also contributed to "La Revue Du Monde Noir" notably including Claude Mac Kay.

Bringing together French thinkers at the time and American writers participating in the Harlem Renaissance, the journal furthered the development of both perspectives.  These thinkers worked together to develop a "black aesthetic" and a sense of pride in the racial identity.

Controversy 
One of the key issues faced by the periodical was that it positioned itself as "apolitical."  This was mainly the result of two considerations.  Firstly, it was intended to keep the periodical from drawing the attention of potential colonial authorities.  Secondly, this was a practical concern intended to make funding easier to access.  Despite Paulette Nardal's claims that the project was cultural and not political, the contents included some articles which were controversy politically subversive.  An example of this would be an article put forth by Etienne Lero and René Menil wherein they condemned both French Colonialism and the "Caribbean bourgeoisie of color."  Ultimately, all of this controversy led to a loss of funding which is why after only six months, the periodical had to end.

Contributors

Volume 1 

 Louis-Jean Finot
 Maître Jean-Louis
 Sénateur Price-Mars
 Docteur Léo Sajous
 Georges Gregory
 Paulette Nardal
 Claude Mac Kay
 John Matheus
 Louis Th. Achille
 G. Joseph-Henri

Volume 2 

 Emile Sicard
 C. Renaud-Molinet
 Léo Sajous
 Clara W. Shepard
 E. Gregoire-Micheli
 Louis Th. Achille
 Lionel Attuly
 Etienne Lero
 Jules Monnerot
 Magd. Raney
 Roberte Horth
 Andrée Nardal
 Joseph Folliet

Volume 3 

 Lionel Attuly
 Docteur A. Marie
 Docteur Zaborowski
 Guy Zuccarelli
 René Menil
 René Maran
 Langston Hughes
 Claude Mac Kay
 F. Eboue
 Étienne Lero
 R. Horth
 M. Raney
 L.- Th. Achille
 Clara W. Shepard
 Gisèle Dubouille

Volume 4 

 Philippe de Zara
 H.M. Bernelot-Moens
 Guetatcheou Zaougha
 Roland Rene-Boisneuf
 Léo Sajous
 Clara W. Shepard
 M. Bazargan
 René Menil
 G. Gratiant
 Yadhé
 Cugo Lewis
 Pierre B. Salzmann

Volume 5 

 L. Th. Beaudza
 H. Ross-Martin
 Léo Frobenius
 Jean L. Bareau
 Guy Zuccarelli
 P. Thoby-Marcelin
 Marcel Boucard
 P. Augarde
 Walter White
 P. Baye-Salzmann
 F. Malval

Volume 6 

 Colonel Nemours
 L.A Revue Mondiale
 Lionel Attuly
 L.-Th. Beaudza
 P. Baye-Salzmann
 Paulette Nardal
 Félix Eboue
 M. Grall
 Flavia Leopold
 G.-D. Perier
 Magd Raney
 Etienne Lero

References 

 Boittin, J.A (2005). In Black and White: Gender, Race Relations, and the Nardal Sisters in Interwar Paris. French Colonial History, 6, 119-135

Defunct periodicals published in France